Steven Stafstrom is an American attorney and politician serving as a member of the Connecticut House of Representatives from the 129th district. He was first elected to the chamber in a special election on February 24, 2015.

Early life and education

Stafstrom was raised in Orange, Connecticut. He received his Bachelor of Arts degree from Fairfield University in 2005. He then received his J.D. degree from the Saint Louis University School of Law in 2008, where he was an articles editor of the Saint Louis University Law Journal.

Career 
As a law student, Stafstrom was a clerk in the office of the Connecticut attorney general. Since 2008, he has been a partner at Pullman & Comley in Bridgeport, Connecticut. He was elected to the Bridgeport City Council in 2013 and the Connecticut House of Representatives in 2015. Since 2019, he has served as co-chair of the House Judiciary Committee. He was previously vice chair of the committee. As co-chair of the House Judiciary Committee, Stafstrom has advocated for statewide criminal justice reform.

References

External links
Official Website
Pullman & Comley profile

Living people
Members of the Connecticut House of Representatives
Fairfield University alumni
Saint Louis University School of Law alumni
1982 births
21st-century American politicians
Connecticut lawyers
People from Orange, Connecticut
People from Bridgeport, Connecticut
Lawyers from Bridgeport, Connecticut